Stecher is a German surname. Notable persons with that name include:

 Dino Stecher (born 1964), Swiss ice hockey goaltender
 Edi Stecher, Austrian Righteous among the Nations
 Jody Stecher (born 1946), American singer and musician
 Joe Stecher (1893–1974), American professional wrestler
 Mario Stecher (born 1977), Austrian skier
 Peter Stecher (born 1965), Austrian archer
 Reinhold Stecher (1921–2013), Austrian prelate of the Roman Catholic Church
 Renate Stecher (born 1950), German athlete
 Tony Stecher (1889–1954), American professional wrestler
 Troy Stecher (born 1994), Canadian professional ice hockey defenceman
 William Stecher (1869–1926), American professional baseball pitcher

German-language surnames